Hansjörg "Hans" Bettembourg (born 28 March 1944) is a Swedish former weightlifter who won a bronze medal in the 90 kg division at the 1972 Summer Olympics. At the world championships he placed eighth in 1969 and sixth in 1971. Between 1969 and 1972 he set 11 world record in the press.

Bettembourg was born in Germany in 1944, and moved to Sweden in 1963.

References

External links
 
 
 
 

1944 births
Living people
Swedish male weightlifters
Olympic weightlifters of Sweden
Weightlifters at the 1972 Summer Olympics
Olympic bronze medalists for Sweden
Olympic medalists in weightlifting
Medalists at the 1972 Summer Olympics
20th-century Swedish people